Carpococcyx is a genus of large terrestrial cuckoos in the family Cuculidae. They are restricted to humid forested regions in Southeast Asia. Despite their similarities, they are not closely related to the South American ground cuckoos of the genus Neomorphus.

Species
This genus contains three allopatric species; two of which until recently were considered conspecific under the name Sunda ground cuckoo:

 
Cuculidae
Bird genera
 
Taxa named by George Robert Gray
Taxonomy articles created by Polbot